{|

{{Infobox ship characteristics
|Ship type=Light cruiser
|Ship displacement=
|Ship length= (o/a)
|Ship beam=
|Ship draught=
|Ship propulsion=4 shafts, 2 steam turbine sets
|Ship speed=
|Ship range= at 
|Ship power=*
12 × Yarrow boilers
|Ship complement=310–480
|Ship armament=*Bristol subclass :
Two BL 6-inch (152 mm) Mk XI guns (50 calibre)
ten BL  Mk VII guns
four QF 3 pounder (47-mm) guns
Two 18 inch (450 mm) torpedo tubes
Weymouth, Chatham, Birmingham subclasses :
Eight to nine BL 6- inch (Mk XI (50 calibre) guns or Mk XII (45 calibre) guns
four QF 3 pounder (47-mm) guns
Two 21 inch (533 mm) torpedo tubes
Birkenhead subclass :
Ten BL 5.5 inch (140 mm) Mk I (50 calibre) guns
One 3 inch (76 mm) anti-aircraft gun
Two 21 inch (533 mm) torpedo tubes
|Ship armour=*Bristol, Weymouth subclasses :
Deck: 
Conning tower: 
Gun Shields: 
 Chatham, Birmingham, Birkenhead subclasses:
Belt: 
Deck: 
Gun Shields: 
Conning tower: 
|Ship notes=
}}
|}
The Town class was a group of twenty-one light cruisers built for the Royal Navy (RN) and Royal Australian Navy (RAN) of the first half of the 20th Century. These vessels were long-range cruisers, suitable for patrolling the vast expanse covered by the British Empire. These ships, initially rated as second class cruisers, were built to a series of designs, known as the Bristol (five ships), Weymouth (four ships), Chatham (three RN ships, plus three RAN ships), Birmingham (three ships, plus one similar RAN ship) and Birkenhead (two ships) classes – all having the names of British towns except for the RAN ships, which were named after Australian cities.

Design
 Bristol class 

The Bristol class were all ordered under the 1908–09 Programme and commissioned in late 1910. They were second class cruisers suitable for a variety of roles including both trade protection and fleet duties. Displacement was  normal and  full load. One ship, Bristol, had Brown-Curtis turbines driving two propeller shafts, while the remaining three ships used Parsons turbines driving four shafts. The experimental two-shaft layout of Bristol was successful, giving greater efficiency, especially at lower speeds.

The Bristols were protected cruisers, with an armoured deck providing protection for the ships' vitals. As the protective deck was at waterline, the ships were given a large metacentric height so that they would remain stable in the event of flooding above the armoured deck. This, however, resulted in the ships rolling badly, making them poor gun platforms. One problem with the armour of the Bristols which was shared with the other Town-class ships was the sizable gap between the bottom of the gun shields and the deck, which allowed shell splinters to pass through the gap, giving large numbers of leg injuries in the ships' gun crews.Brown 2010, p. 160.

It was originally intended that the Bristol class would be fitted with a main gun armament of unshielded  guns, but the need to counter German light cruisers (such as the ), which were armed with ten  guns that outranged British 4-inch guns, resulted in the new class's armament being revised. They had two BL 6-inch (152 mm) Mk XI naval guns mounted on the ships' centreline fore and aft, with ten BL 4-inch Mk VII guns in waist mountings. All these guns were fitted with shields. Four Vickers 3-pounder (47 mm) saluting guns were fitted, while two submerged 18 inch (450 mm) torpedo tubes were fitted, with seven torpedoes carried. This armament was considered rather too light for ships of this size, while the waist guns were subject to immersion in a high sea, making them difficult to work.

They had a crew of 480 officers and men, with the officers accommodated in the forward part of the ship, rather than aft as per tradition, following the instructions of Admiral Fisher to improve fighting efficiency. This arrangement was unpopular, however, as it was preferred to keep officer's and other ranks accommodation separate for disciplinary reasons, while the Bristol class were very cramped, with only  for each seaman to live eat and sleep.Lyon Warship Vol. 1 No. 2, p. 61. In the First World War, the class's anti-aircraft armament was increased with the fitting of a single QF 3 inch (76 mm) 20 cwt gun.

Weymouth class
The Weymouth class were ordered under the 1909–1910 Programme and commissioned between 1911 and 1912. Major changes from the Bristol class included a heavier main armament of eight 6 in guns, and changes to improve seaworthiness and reduce overcrowding. Displacement was  normal and  full load. Machinery was similar to the Bristol class, with again a single example (Yarmouth) having the Brown-Curtis turbines and two-shaft arrangement used in Bristol, while the remaining three ships had the four-shaft, Yarrow turbine machinery. Speed remained 25 knots.

Armour remained unchanged from the Bristols, while the main gun armament was changed to eight BL 6 inch Mk XI guns. The arrangement of the armament was revised, with three guns (one on the centreline and two on the beam) on an enlarged forecastle that also provided accommodation for the ships' officers. The remaining waist guns were protected by a bulwark to make them more weather resistant. Torpedo armament was increased, with two 21-inch (533 mm) submerged tubes (with seven torpedoes carried), while the ships' armament was completed by four 3-pounder saluting guns.

The class saw a number of alterations during the war, including the addition of a single 3 in (76 mm) AA gun in 1915, while the surviving ships were fitted with director control equipment for the ships' guns on a new tripod foremast. In 1917, Yarmouth was the first light cruiser to be able to operate aircraft, being fitted with a ramp above the conning tower and forecastle gun to allow a Sopwith Pup to be launched from the ship, although the aircraft could not land back on it so the pilot would have to ditch into the sea if it was not possible to reach land. In 1918, Weymouth also received a similar installation.

Chatham class

The Chatham class of six ships, three for the Royal Navy and three for Australia (of which one was to be built in Australia) were ordered under the 1910–1911 Programme. The five British-built ships commissioned between 1912 and 1913, while Brisbane, the Australian-built ship was laid down in 1913 and completed in 1916. The major difference between the Chathams and the earlier Towns was a revised armour scheme. While the earlier ships were protected cruisers, depending on an armoured deck deep within the ship to protect machinery and magazines, the Chathams relied on a vertical belt of armour.

Displacement was  normal and  full load. This belt was part of the load bearing structure of the ship, reducing the overall weight of structure required. The ships' forecastle was again extended aft, reaching two-thirds of the length of the ship, and allowing two more guns to be raised up onto the forecastle, while the ships' metacentric height was reduced, making the ships better gun platforms. Officer's accommodation was moved back to the rear of the ships in this class. Machinery layout was again similar to the earlier Towns, with one ship, Southampton, having a two-shaft layout.
 
While main armament again consisted of eight 6 in guns in single mountings, a new gun, the BL 6 inch Mk XII was used. This was shorter and lighter than the Mk XI guns used in earlier ships, and while range was slightly less ( compared to ), they were much easier to handle in rough weather and were more accurate. They had larger magazines, giving up to 200 rounds per gun rather than 150 in earlier ships. The remaining armament was unchanged.

Wartime changes were similar to those made to the Weymouths, with a 3-inch anti-aircraft gun fitted during 1915 and director control with its associated tripod mast fitted later in the war. Four of the ships (Dublin, Southampton, Melbourne and Sydney) were fitted for platforms for operating aircraft.

Birmingham class

The 1911–1912 Programme brought the Birmingham class'''. Three ships were ordered for the Royal Navy, commissioning in 1914. A fourth, similar, ship, Adelaide, was built in Sydney for Australia. The First World War caused the construction of Adelaide, which was reliant on materials and parts from the United Kingdom, to be heavily delayed, with Adelaide not completing until 1922. They were closely based on the Chatham class but with a revised armament. While in theory, three guns could fire forwards in the previous arrangement (the forward centreline gun and the forward two waist guns), in practice the effects of blast from the waist guns on the bridge and conning tower prevented this. The solution was to mount two guns side-by side on the forecastle, forward of the bridge, giving a total armament of nine BL 6 inch Mk XII guns. The remainder of the armament was unchanged (i.e. four 3-pounder saluting guns and two submerged 21-inch torpedo tubes).

The ships' forecastle had increased flare to reduce spray.

A 3-inch anti-aircraft gun was fitted in 1915, while Lowestoft and Birmingham were fitted with director control. (Nottingham was lost before it could be fitted). Adelaide was completed with these modifications, and received a major refit in the 1930s, with coal-fired boilers being removed along with a funnel, reducing the ship's speed, while one 6-inch was removed, with 4-inch anti-aircraft guns added. She was subject to further armament revisions during the Second World War, with more 6- and 4-inch guns removed to accommodate depth charge throwers, and radar being fitted.

Further developments: Atlantic cruisers and Hawkins class

In 1912, work began on a new cruiser for trade protection duties in response to rumours of large German cruisers that were thought to being built for commerce raiding. When the rumoured German ships proved to be false, the Atlantic cruiser was abandoned.

In 1915, as a response to German commerce raiding in the early months of the war, the British Admiralty decided to build a new class of large, fast and heavily armed cruisers for trade protection work. Again, a mixed armament of 7.5 in and 6 in guns were chosen, with mixed oil- and coal-fired boilers in order to aid operations in distant waters where oil supplies would be limited.

Birkenhead class
In early 1914, the Greek Navy, in response to Turkish naval expansion, placed an order with the Coventry Syndicate, a consortium of the shipbuilders Cammell Laird, Fairfields, John Brown and the armament company Coventry Ordnance Works, for two light cruisers and four destroyers. The light cruisers, which were both to be built by Cammell Laird, and to be named Antinavarchos Kountouriotis and Lambros Katsonis, were based on the design of the Chatham and Birmingham classes, but with a revised armament to be supplied by the Coventry Ordnance Works.Preston 1985, p. 58.

Armour was as fitted to the Chathams. Machinery was also as in the Chathams. The ships' main armament was ten QF 5.5 in (140 mm) Mark I guns (50 calibres long) to a new design by Coventry Ordnance Works. The lighter shell was easier to handle, and gave a greater rate of fire.Brown 2009, pp. 64–65. It was planned to fit the ships with two 12-pounder  (76 mm) anti-aircraft guns, while two 21-inch torpedo tubes were fitted.

Work continued on the two ships for the Greeks after the outbreak of the First World War, but early in 1915, with no sign of an end to the war, the British Admiralty took over the contract for the two ships, which became the Birkenhead class, together with the 5.5-inch guns and ammunition. The 12-pounder  anti-aircraft guns were unavailable, however, and Vickers 3-pounder guns were fitted in their place.

After the war, they were offered for sale back to the Greeks, but this offer was not taken up.

Ships

Operational service

The class saw much service in the First World War and many of the ships left their mark on history. Ships of the class saw action at the Battles of Coronel, the Battle of the Falkland Islands and the Battle of Heligoland Bight in 1914. That same year, Sydney attacked  in an action that lasted over an hour and resulted in the German warship being beached by her captain to avoid his ship sinking. Also that year, Birmingham became the first ship to sink a submarine when she rammed the German submarine  on 9 August.

In 1915, HMS Glasgow found , which had escaped from the engagement at the Falkland Islands the previous year, in which Glasgow had helped in sinking . Dresden was eventually scuttled by her own crew after a short engagement. Ships of the class also took part in the Battle of Dogger Bank in 1915.

In 1916, ships of the class also saw action at the Battle of Jutland, the largest surface engagement of the First World War . In 1917, a Sopwith Pup from HMS Yarmouth became the first aircraft from a cruiser to shoot down an aircraft, specifically the Zeppelin L23. The ships of the class saw more service than mentioned above, including action against German merchant ships. During the course of the war, two ships of the class were sunk: these were HMS Falmouth and HMS Nottingham, both torpedoed by German submarines.

After the end of the First World War, the surviving ships performed a variety of duties, including service on foreign stations. All ships, except Adelaide, were scrapped by the 1930s. Adelaide saw an extensive refit between 1938 and 1939. However, Adelaide'' was obsolete when the Second World War began, and she saw limited service, performing patrol and escort duties in the Pacific and Indian Oceans. She was decommissioned in 1945, but recommissioned to become a tender at Sydney. She was broken up in 1949.

Notes

Citations

References

External links

Allied light cruisers of World War I

Cruiser classes
Ship classes of the Royal Navy